The Breakdown was a 1926 painting by Scottish artist John Bulloch Souter (1890–1972) which stirred controversy in the United Kingdom during the Jazz Age. The work depicted a black jazz musician playing the saxophone while a naked white woman dances, as if in a trance.

Amid outrage in the British press, the painting was withdrawn from the Royal Academy Summer Exhibition in 1926 after one week at the request of the British Colonial Office as the subject matter "was considered to be obnoxious to British subjects living abroad in daily contact with a coloured population".

The painting was then destroyed by its author and his wife, but Souter preserved his preparatory drawings and made a reconstructed version in 1962, one decade before his death. The painting has been described as embodying the fears of Western civilization towards jazz music.

Description and themes 
In Souter's painting, a negro jazz musician is in full white tie evening dress with a top hat; he sits on a cast down and shattered classical statue of Minerva, the goddess of virginity and traditional values. Nearby, an androgynous female dancer — a flapper with short bobbed hair — has her eyes are closed, as if she is in a trance. Her hastily discarded lingerie and green leather shoes are scattered on the ground, with just one green earring visible. A flesh-colored stocking lies draped over the statue's broken arm.

The musician's race and instrument signifies that he is playing jazz music. He is black and the woman is white, playing on contemporaneous concerns about the popularity of (predominantly black) jazz music to the (predominantly white) British public, and the perceived threat posed by hypersexualised and exoticised black men to white women, in the wake of thousands of brown babies born to British women following World War I. However, according to critic Karl Toepfer, "the musician gazes not at the woman but out toward the spectator, and the implication is that jazz and dance together allow man and woman to cross racial barriers and form a new and mysteriously intimate (or trusting) sort of couple, each immersed in separate aspirations."

Souter's stated intention was to "illustrate the tendency nowadays for Jazz's influence to permeate our daily lives", and to "suggest the fascination exercised by the primitive and savage upon the over-civilised". The title of his painting was a twin reference to both "a musical breakdown," in which a jazz musician has the freedom to express their own improvised statement, and "a societal breakdown" in which women in British society could express a similar freedom now that gender roles had been redefined.

Reception

Popular enthusiasm 

The painting was exhibited at the Royal Academy Summer Exhibition starting on 3 May 1926, the day before the start of the 1926 General Strike. The painting was viewed by King George V, British statesman Ramsay MacDonald, the Countess Baldwin of Bewdley, Lady Cynthia Asquith, Dame Lloyd George, and other notable personages. Initially, Frank Dicksee, the President of the Royal Academy, praised Souter's piece as "a work of great promise by executed with a considerable degree of excellence". According to Catherine Tackley, professor of music at the University of Liverpool, "the reaction to the painting epitomise[d] the response to this new jazz music" with "huge popular enthusiasm" mixed with "an undercurrent of suspicion that this was a dangerous new art form subverting decent society."

Ultimately, at the request of the Colonial Office which deemed the painting to be a threat to the interests of the British empire, the painting was removed after merely five days and replaced by an uncontroversial portrait of Lady Diana Manners by James Jebusa Shannon. Despite its removal, word of Souter's painting had already spread, and crowds of excited visitors thronged to the exhibition only to search the walls in vain for the sequestered work. Explanations by the exhibition's attendants did little to convince disappointed audiences that it had been withdrawn upon "the request of the Colonial Office who disapproved, from the Colonial standpoint, of the subject—a negro playing jazz for a nude white dancer." The only remaining evidence that the painting had been exhibited was a photograph of the work displayed in the front hall.

Press condemnation 
The work was widely condemned in British newspapers and periodicals and its exhibition quickly became controversial. In an early edition of the Melody Maker, a British weekly music magazine, London-born critic Edgar Jackson demanded the painting be encindered:

The world press likewise fixated upon the painting. In the United States of America, a journalist for The New York Times assailed the work as "this year's problem picture." After conceding that "as a protest against the jazz age, the picture seems undoubtedly effective," the Times journalist nevertheless opined that the work would excite needless controversy and should not have been exhibited. Similarly, Boston Evening Transcript criticised the work under the headline "A Racial Outrage" and claimed the painting was designed "to horrify decent people". Likewise, in South Africa, the Cape Argus deemed the work to be a "problem picture ... Negro Supersedes Minerva".

Destruction 
Following outrage by the press and the painting's withdrawal from exhibition, Souter and his wife Christian Grace Reid destroyed his original 1926 painting, but Souter kept his preparatory drawings. For decades the work was only known from a photograph published in the exhibition catalogue but, towards the end of his life, Souter made a second version in the 1960s. A charcoal study was acquired by the Aberdeen Art Gallery in 2016, with funding from the Scottish National Fund for Acquisitions.

Legacy and influence

English writer Evelyn Waugh attended the exhibition in its first week. The controversy over the painting may have inspired him to include a mixed-race relationship between his fictional characters of the white Margot and black Chokey in his 1928 novel Decline and Fall.

According to Gemma Romain, a historian and researcher focusing on black history in Britain, Souter's now-destroyed Jazz Age work retains considerable legacy as a landmark in British culture:

References

Bibliography

External links 
 John Bulloch Souter's The Breakdown (Lyon & Turnbull)

1926 paintings
1962 paintings
Works about jazz
Musical instruments in art
Black people in art
Women in art
Nude art
Erotic art
Black British history
Paintings of Minerva
Flappers